Roland Opfer (born 3 December 1974) is a German rower. He competed in the men's double sculls event at the 1996 Summer Olympics.

References

External links
 

1974 births
Living people
German male rowers
Olympic rowers of Germany
Rowers at the 1996 Summer Olympics
Rowers from Hamburg